"Popcorn Love" is a single by New Edition, released on August 6, 1983. It was released as the third and final single from their debut album, Candy Girl on the Streetwise label. The single read #25 on the R&B chart.

Charts

Another Bad Creation version

Cover version
Another Bad Creation covered "Popcorn Love"'s flip side, "Jealous Girl" (in a slightly extended version) on July 23, 1991, which also reached #25 on the R&B chart.

Mase recorded a parody of "Jealous Girl" for his Harlem World album, called "Jealous Guy", with him, 112 and Puff Daddy singing like New Edition but with altered lyrics.

References

1983 songs
1983 singles
1991 singles
New Edition songs
Another Bad Creation songs
Songs written by Maurice Starr
Songs written by Michael Jonzun
Motown singles
Contemporary R&B ballads